The University of Nebraska Press, also known as UNP, was founded in 1941 and is an academic publisher of scholarly and general-interest books. The press is under the auspices of the University of Nebraska–Lincoln, the main campus of the University of Nebraska system. UNP publishes primarily non-fiction books and academic journals, in both print and electronic editions. The press has particularly strong publishing programs in Native American studies, Western American history, sports, world and national affairs, and military history. The press has also been active in reprinting classic books from various genres, including science fiction and fantasy.

Since its inception, UNP has published more than 4,000 books and 30 journals, adding another 150 new titles each year, making it the 12th largest university press in the United States. Since 2010, two of UNP's books have received the Bancroft Prize, the highest honor bestowed on history books in the U.S.

Domestic distribution for the press is currently provided by the University of North Carolina Press's Longleaf Services.

History
UNP began in November 1941 at the prompting of University of Nebraska Chancellor Chauncey Borcher, who hired Emily Schossberger as UNP's first editor. UNP became the 32nd American university press and 7th in the Midwest. During Schossberger's 17-year tenure UNP published 97 books, primarily focused on regional titles and the works of Louise Pound, Karl Shapiro, and George W. Norris. Following Schossberger's departure, Bruce Nicoll became UNP's first official director and Virginia Faulkner became editor-in-chief. Nicoll led the UNP for 17 years and expanded its focus to publish books of more diverse backgrounds, not simply monographs for and by scholars. That led to the launch of UNP's first imprint in 1961, Bison Books, specializing in paperback books which would be sold in non-traditional places such as truck stops, drug stores, and gas stations. In 1966 the press expanded by creating distribution partnerships overseas.

In 1975, Dave Gilbert became UNP director and reoriented Bison Books toward a more western focus. Gilbert also hired designer Richard Eckersley and his wife Dika to bring all book design in house. Gilbert eventually left UNP for a post at Cornell University and was succeeded by editor-in-chief Bill Regier, UNP's third full-time director. Regier expanded UNP's focus beyond the American West. UNP into foreign translations and literature, particularly France and Scandinavia, with three translation authors later receiving Nobel Prizes. By 1991, UNP had 2,000 books in print, was adding 100 new books a year, and had annual sales of $4.5 million. In 1995, Dan Ross took over as UNP's fourth director, expanding Bison Books to focus on sports books, especially baseball, resulting in UNP's highly regarded publishing program in sports. That same year UNP's annual sales topped $6 million, a 600 percent increase from 1980.

By the early 2000s, Gary Dunham took over as director and in 2009 UNP sold its longtime warehouse in the Haymarket. With Donna Shear as editor-in-chief, Bison Books was redefined to solely represent books of the west and UNP in general switched to a print-on-demand model of publishing, coordinating the simultaneous release of e-books with the print editions. Shear also tripled journal production to 30 publications and in September 2011 the press entered into a collaborative publishing arrangement with the Jewish Publication Society, one of the oldest Jewish publishers in the United States. In April 2013, the press acquired Potomac Books, a publisher specializing in military and diplomatic topics. With the new additions, UNP surpassed $7 million in sales in 2015, moved up in status with the American Association of University Presses, and become the 12th largest university press in the country. Since 2010, two of the press' books have received the Bancroft Prize, the highest honor bestowed on history books in the U.S.

Imprints

Nebraska 
Under its Nebraska imprint, UNP publishes both scholarly and general interest books, with a particular focus on Native and Indigenous studies, history, sports history, American studies and cultural criticism, environmental studies, anthropology, and creative works. UNP publishes scholarly editions of the works of Willa Cather, including the classics My Ántonia and O Pioneers!.

Bison Books 
Bison Books began in 1961 as UNP's first trade imprint and originally focused on inexpensive paperbacks of general-interest works in Western Americana. In 2013 Bison Books shifted its focus to the trans-Mississippi West. The imprint has featured the work of notable authors such as André Breton, George Armstrong Custer, William F. Cody, Loren Eiseley, Michel Foucault, Che Guevara, Wright Morris, Tillie Olsen, Mari Sandoz, Wallace Stegner, Leo Tolstoy, Philip Wylie, and Stefan Zweig.

Potomac Books 
Potomac Books began in 1983 as Brassey's, Inc., the U.S. imprint of a longstanding British publishing enterprise that focused on military subjects.  The trade imprint was then acquired by Books International in 1999 and renamed Potomac Books in 2004, expanding its catalog to include world and national affairs, presidential history, diplomats and diplomacy, and biography and memoir. UNP purchased Potomac Books in 2013.

Jewish Publication Society 

The Jewish Publication Society, also known as JPS and originally known as the Jewish Publication Society of America, is the oldest nonprofit, nondenominational publisher of Jewish works in English. Founded in Philadelphia in 1888, JPS is especially well known for its English translation of the Hebrew Bible, the JPS Tanakh. UNP purchased all of JPS's outstanding book inventory, and is responsible for the production, distribution, and marketing of all JPS publications, although JPS continues its operations from its Philadelphia headquarters, acquiring new manuscripts and developing new projects.

See also

 List of English-language book publishing companies
 List of university presses
 Prairie Schooner magazine
 Nineteenth-Century French Studies (scholarly journal)

References

External links 
 
 "Fight Over a Beloved (and Lucrative) Book"

1941 establishments in Nebraska
American speculative fiction publishers
Publishing companies established in 1941
University of Nebraska–Lincoln
Nebraska, University of, Press
American companies established in 1941